Webb is a village in the Canadian province of Saskatchewan within the Rural Municipality of Webb No. 138 and Census Division No. 8.

History 
Webb incorporated as a village on June 18, 1910.

Demographics 

See also 

 List of communities in Saskatchewan
 Villages of Saskatchewan
 Paradise Hill Airport

Footnotes

Villages in Saskatchewan
Webb No. 138, Saskatchewan
Division No. 8, Saskatchewan